The 2006 Petit Le Mans was the ninth race for the 2006 American Le Mans Series season.  It took place on September 30, 2006.

Official results

Class winners in bold.  Cars failing to complete 70% of winner's distance marked as Not Classified (NC).

Statistics
 Pole Position - #88 Creation Autosportif - 1:10.829
 Fastest Lap - #16 Dyson Racing - 1:12.374
 Average Speed -

External links

  

P
Petit Le Mans